Parken Sport & Entertainment A/S (short: PS&E) is a Danish company located at Parken Stadium in the Østerbro area of Copenhagen. The company was founded on 1. April 1991 to run the football club F.C. Copenhagen (in Danish: F.C. København or just FCK). Today PS&E operates F.C. Copenhagen, Lalandia (water parks), Parken Stadium stadium and office space for leasing at the stadium.

Board and Directors 
PS&E board Members and Directors (pr. 17 September 2020):

Owners and Group Structure 
Parken Sport & Entertainment's major shareholders are:

 Seier Capital Denmark A/S: 22,55% (owned by Lars Seier)
 KPS Invest A/S: 20,54% (owned by Karl Peter Korsgaard Sørensen)
 Es-Parken ApS: 29,8% (owned by Erik Skjærbæk)

The group 
The companies used to operate the different businesses in the group are:

 Driftsselskabet af 1. marts 2006 A/S (100 % ownership)
 Accommodation Services A/S (100% ownership)
 Lalandia A/S (100% ownership)
 Lalandia Billund A/S (100 % ownership)

References

F.C. Copenhagen
Entertainment companies of Denmark
1992 establishments in Denmark
Sports holding companies